Anthony Smith (born 21 September 1971) is an English former professional footballer.

A defender, he previously played professionally in all three divisions of the Football League for Sunderland, Hartlepool United and Northampton Town. He began his managerial career in 2011, with non-league side Chester-le-Street Town, and also had spells managing Gateshead, West Auckland Town and Holland Park Hawks.

Career
Smith began his career with Sunderland, making 25 appearances in all competitions without scoring in five seasons at the club. He made 7 appearances for Hartlepool United on loan in 1992. Smith went on to play 4 games for Northampton Town before retiring due to injury at the age of 24.

Smith was named manager of Northern League side Chester-le-Street Town in September 2011, but left the club in June 2012 to join Gateshead.

On 10 December 2012, Smith was named caretaker manager at Gateshead after Ian Bogie and Terry Mitchell were relieved of their duties. Three days later, Smith was named permanent manager and given a contract until the end of the 2012–13 season. After a 17th-place finish, Smith was given a one-year contract for the 2013–14 season. Smith resigned from his post on 18 August 2013 after defeats in the opening three games of the 2013–14 season.

In August 2014, Smith was named manager of West Auckland Town. Smith led West to the top of the table and with a nine-point lead, but due to executive interference, he resigned in December. Smith joined Holland Park Hawks, but left the club in July 2017 because of visa issues.

Personal life
His brother is former Sunderland full back Dan Smith.

Career statistics

Managerial statistics

References

External links
 
 

1971 births
Living people
Footballers from Sunderland
English footballers
Association football defenders
Sunderland A.F.C. players
Hartlepool United F.C. players
Northampton Town F.C. players
English Football League players
Gateshead F.C. non-playing staff
English football managers
Chester-le-Street Town F.C. managers
Gateshead F.C. managers
West Auckland Town F.C. managers
National League (English football) managers